The questionable cause—also known as causal fallacy, false cause, or non causa pro causa ("non-cause for cause" in Latin)—is a category of informal fallacies in which a cause is incorrectly identified.

For example: "Every time I go to sleep, the sun goes down. Therefore, my going to sleep causes the sun to set." The two events may coincide, but have no causal connection.

Fallacies of questionable cause include:
 Circular cause and consequence
 Correlation implies causation (cum hoc, ergo propter hoc)
 Third-cause fallacy
 Wrong direction
 Fallacy of the single cause
 Post hoc ergo propter hoc
 Regression fallacy
 Texas sharpshooter fallacy
 Jumping to conclusions
 Association fallacy
 Magical thinking

References

External links
 Non causa pro causa in the Fallacy Files by Gary N. Curtis

 
Informal fallacies